These page shows the results for the 64th edition of the Gent–Wevelgem cycling classic over 214 kilometres, held on Wednesday April 10, 2002. There were a total number of 193 competitors, with 85 finishing the race, which was won by Italy's Mario Cipollini for the third time.

Final classification

References

External links
Official race website

Gent–Wevelgem
2002 in road cycling
2002 in Belgian sport
April 2002 sports events in Europe